Zolotaya Griva is a rural locality (a village) in Gorod Vyazniki, Vyaznikovsky District, Vladimir Oblast, Russia. The population was 2 as of 2010.

Geography 
Zolotaya Griva is located 7 km northeast of Vyazniki (the district's administrative centre) by road. Ivanovka is the nearest rural locality.

References 

Rural localities in Vyaznikovsky District